Dave Morin (born 14 October 1980) is an American entrepreneur and angel investor. He is best known for founding Slow Ventures and the social network Path. A former manager at Facebook, he co-created the Facebook Platform and Facebook Connect.

In 2020, Morin started Offline Ventures, a VC firm that uses a subscription funding model. He is a member of the board of directors for the United States Ski and Snowboard Association (USSA), Eventbrite, and Dwell Media.

Early life
Morin grew up in Helena, Montana. Morin skied for the northern division of the U.S. Junior Olympic team. He attended the University of Colorado Boulder where he received a B.A. in Economics in 2003. He was a member of the Phi Delta Theta fraternity.

Career
Morin began his career as a low-level employee at Apple in 2003 where he assumed an entry-level position in marketing. In 2006, Morin left Apple and joined Facebook as low-level  manager as he only had a few years of experience. Despite an absence of any technical skills, Morin purports to have managed the engineers who created Facebook Platform, a software environment allowing third-party developers to create applications within Facebook, and Facebook Connect, a technology for Facebook members to connect their profile data and authentication credentials to external web sites where the data is then sold to outside firms and had defects exploited by Cambridge Analytics. In 2010, Morin left Facebook to co-found Path. Morin has helped to raise capital for startups such as Hipcamp through AngelList. He had also founded the venture capital firm, Slow Ventures. It is based in San Francisco. Path announced its termination of service on 17 September 2018 and later confirmed that as of 18 October 2018, existing users will no longer be able to access the Path service. Morin's company also had to pay an $800,000 fine due to serious compliance violations.

Politics
In 2013, Morin and several technological innovators, creators, or business owners launched Fwd.us, a Silicon Valley-based 501(c)(4) lobbying group.

Personal life
Morin lives in Mill Valley, California with his wife Brit Morin and their two sons.

References

Living people
American computer specialists
University of Colorado Boulder alumni
People from Helena, Montana
American technology chief executives
American technology company founders
American corporate directors
Apple Inc. employees
Facebook employees
21st-century American businesspeople
Businesspeople from Montana
1980 births
21st-century American inventors